Egremont is a civil parish in the Borough of Copeland, Cumbria, England.  It contains 26 buildings that are recorded in the National Heritage List for England.  Of these, one is listed at Grade I, the highest of the three grades, and the others are at Grade II, the lowest grade.  The parish contains the town of Egremont and the surrounding countryside.  The oldest listed building is Egremont Castle; this and associated structures are listed.  Most of the other listed buildings are houses and associated structures, farmhouses and farm buildings.  The other listed buildings include churches, cemetery buildings, shops, two former toll houses, a milestone, a monument, a town hall, a drinking fountain, and two war memorials.


Key

Buildings

References

Citations

Sources

Lists of listed buildings in Cumbria
Listed buildings in